Antonio León Amador, better known as Leoncito (30 August 1909 – 11 March 1995) was a Spanish professional association football player. He was born in Sevilla. Amador spent his career playing as a midfielder. The most significant part of his career was playing for Real Madrid CF in over 100 matches, in which he scored nine times.

Clubs

International selection
He played in two matches for the Spain national football team in 1931.

References
 
 Real Madrid profile
 
 

Spanish footballers
Spain international footballers
Real Madrid CF players
Real Valladolid players
Sevilla FC players
1909 births
1995 deaths
Association football midfielders
La Liga players
Cultural y Deportiva Leonesa players
Tercera División managers
Recreativo de Huelva managers